The Galvatrons are a four-piece rock band who formed on 28 August 2007, in Geelong, Australia. Lead singer Johnny Galvatron stated on radio station 101.3 Sea FM on the Central Coast that the band got their name from the 1986 animated film Transformers. The Galvatrons cite their influences as Devo, Stan Bush, Australian Crawl, Van Halen, Lion, Cheap Trick, Kim Wilde, Queen, Stevie Nicks, Pat Benatar, Kenny Loggins, Tears for Fears and Gary Numan.
The band have completed their debut album, as announced via their MySpace, which was released 3 July 2009.

Biography

2007–2008: When We Were Kids
The band's first taste of mainstream success was with the release of their debut single, When We Were Kids. The single was released from their debut EP, also titled When We Were Kids. It was released by Warner Music Australia on 3 May 2008. The title track was the number one most added track on radio in Australia for the week 19–26 April 2008. They played the Big Day Out, Meredith and Cherry Rock festivals in summer 2007/2008 and are touring Australia throughout 2008. They then played a festival tour in the United Kingdom alongside The Police at London's Hyde Park where they were evicted from the concert after allegedly singing Metallica songs loudly in the room next door to Sting.

On 1 November 2008 Johnny Galvatron appeared on the TV show RocKwiz . He performed Toto's "Hold the Line" as a duet with Wendy Matthews.

Beginning in Perth on 31 October 2008, The Galvatrons were support act for Def Leppard and Cheap Trick during Def Leppard's Songs From The Sparkle Lounge Australian tour. The show ran from late October to mid November and had a total of 7 shows throughout the country. Alongside this tour, the band headed its own national tour known as the Robots Are Cool tour.

2009: Laser Graffiti
On 17 November 2008, the Galvatrons released a demo version of a song that was rumoured to be a track from their upcoming debut album. The song, "Robots Are Cool", was a popular track played during their tour with Def Leppard and Cheap Trick. It was available as a free download via the band's official Myspace.

A few days following the demo release of "Robots Are Cool", the band released a bulletin via Myspace stating work on their debut album would soon commence and be ready for release by April 2009. The album, Laser Graffiti, was then completed and the release date pushed back to 3 July 2009. Front man Johnny Galvatron stated "[The record] sounds like it's from the future". The album was received with good reviews, being described as "the ultimate rock party album". After touring extensively in 2009, the Galvatrons picked up a reputation amongst the Australian live music scene for having an energetic live performance.

2016: Galvatrons reunion
After a long hiatus the Galvatrons were interviewed by Harris Robotis on a late night episode of Rage, stating that they were back together and would be releasing an album in the coming year. Johnny Galvatron was quoted as saying, "yeah I popped on the Transformers movie from the '80s and realised there was a few guitar licks I hadn't been 'inspired' from and realised there's another whole album's worth of content in there so here we are."

2021: Future featurette
After 10 years of inactivity, old uploads of the Galvatrons started appearing on the internet. This included a remix by Harris Robotis of "She's in Love". Harris also stated in an interview that the Galvatrons had been back in the studio recording a "sci-fi rock opera" with the premise that the Galvatrons from even further in the future had returned to party again in the past, arriving on huge black cubes descending from space. This time however instead of shouting, "we're from the future - and you kids turn out OK!" They replaced it with "we're all fucked". The single release from the album was to be "The Obsolete Galaxy", which featured guitar solos from Johnny Galvatron. The release was to be tied in with Johnny's separate project, a video game made by Beethoven and Dinosaur called The Artful Escape.

Members
Johnny "Galvatron" – vocals, guitar
Robert Convery "Bozza" – percussion
Pete Convery "OG Conepuller" – bass
Pete "Gamma" – keyboard/synth
Manny Bourakis "Ultra Fang" – original drummer

Discography

Albums

Extended plays

References

External links
 The Galvatrons' website
 The Galvatrons at Warnermusic.com.au

Australian rock music groups
Musical groups established in 2007